Michael and the Messengers were an attempt to take advantage of the popularity of the group "The Messengers". Originally formed in Minnesota as a high school band, they were re-formed in Milwaukee at Marquette University by the original bass player, Greg Jeresek. The Messengers had regional hits on USA Records, and mild national success on Motown's Rare Earth label.

The Messengers started out in Winona, Minnesota in 1962 as a high school band consisting of: Greg Jeresek (aka Greg Jennings) bass, guitarists Greg Bambenek and Roy Berger, keyboardist Chip Andrews, and drummer Jim Murray.

In Milwaukee, 1965, The band consisted of Peter Barnes-lead guitar, Greg Jeresek-bass guitar, Jesse Roe-organ, Jeff Taylor-lead vocals, and Augie Jurishica-drums.
This group released a cover of "In the Midnight Hour", and, shortly after, signed with Motown Records.  They then moved to Detroit.  They had a few releases with Motown that broke into the 'hot 100' nationally and toured with the Supremes.

When The Messengers signed with Motown they could not promote or release a followup to "Midnight Hour" on the USA label.  At this time a Chicago DJ formed the "Michael and the Messengers" group to cash in on The Messengers' success.  This group put out a cover of "(Just Like) Romeo and Juliet", copying the style of The Messengers.  They broke up shortly after.

In 1968, several of the members of the 'Motown' Messengers left the group and, while still calling themselves "The Messengers", they became: Michael Morgan, Peter Barnes, Bob (Mother) Cavallo, and John Hoier. Morgan and Barnes would team up again in 1976 along with Ted Medbury to form the short lived pop group The Movies.

In 1971, this group of Messengers reached number 62 in the US national charts with "That's the Way a Woman is." Perhaps due to the simplicity of the lyrics, this single was an even bigger hit in Japan (under the title "Ki ni naru onna no ko" 気になる女の子). This song had a small revival in 2005 in Japan due to its being used in an Otsuka Pharmaceutical's "Amino Supli" sports drink commercial.

Songs
"My Baby" Soma Records
"I've Seen You Around" Soma Records
"Midnight Hour" USA Records
"Hard, Hard Year" USA Records
"Up 'til News" USA Records
"Romeo & Juliet" USA Records (New line up - Made famous on the legendary Nuggets: Original Artyfacts from the First Psychedelic Era, 1965-1968 compilation)
"California Soul" Soul/Motown Records
"Window Shopping" Soul/Motown Records
 "Gotta See Jane" Rare Earth/Motown Records
"That's the Way a Woman Is" Rare Earth/Motown Records (Michael Morgan - John Hoier) 
'"Right On"
"I Gotta Dance"
"The Letter" (the B-side of "That's the Way the Woman Is" in Japan)

References

External links
Music Match "Michael and the Messengers" biography.
Gary Myers, "Do you Hear that Beat"

Garage rock groups from Minnesota
Musical groups established in 1962
1962 establishments in Minnesota

ja:メッセンジャーズ